The Trail of the Whispering Giants is a collection of sculptures by Hungarian-born artist Peter Wolf Toth. In 2009, there were 74 Whispering Giants, with at least one in each of the 50 U.S. states, as well as in Ontario and Manitoba, Canada, and one in Hungary. One in Oregon was removed in 2017 after irreparable windstorm damage, reducing the total to 73. In 1988, Toth completed his goal of placing at least one statue in each of the 50 states, by carving one in Hawaii, and in 2008, he created his first Whispering Giant in Europe, Stephen I of Hungary in Délegyháza, Hungary along the Danube River.

In 2009, eight more Whispering Giants were planned.

The sculptures

(Update February 2, 2015) The Trail of the Whispering Giants is an ongoing project and much of the material here especially the chart below is out of date and too extensive to edit fully this article. A traveler, David Schumaker, went on a quest to identify all the Whispering Giant statues and has documented 57 existing statues and identified 12 that are now missing or destroyed since Peter Wolf Toth began this project in 1972. Schumaker has documented his information on the WEB site Peter Wolf Toth which has the most current information on the Whispering Giants and messages from the artist himself.

Toth always donates the Whispering Giant he creates to the town he carved it in, and never charges a fee for his time. The carvings have been appraised at a quarter of a million dollars each.

Toth uses a hammer and a chisel as the basic tools to create the Whispering Giants, but on occasion will use a mallet and an axe, or rarely power tools. Before starting work on a Whispering Giant, Toth confers with local Native American tribes and local lawmakers. The sculpture that is created is a composite of all the physical characteristics, especially facial features, of the local tribe or tribes, as well as their stories and histories.  Toth dismisses the notion that the Whispering Giant sculptures are totem poles or represent Native American art, and has further stated that it would be inappropriate to carve totems because they were traditionally carved by Northwestern Indian tribes and had religious significance, where his carvings are intended as sculptures of Native American people.

Currently Peter Toth resides in Edgewater, Florida, where he has a small studio where he carves small wooden statues to raise money to create more Whispering Giants. He travels around America to repair Whispering Giants he carved in the past that have not been kept up, as well as to carve new ones. The latest Whispering Giant carved was in Vincennes, Indiana, in 2009 out of Black Oak, but there are still eight more statues planned to be built.

The Trail

References

Bibliography

Notes

External links
 
 Smithsonian Institution Research Information System (SIRIS) Art Inventories Catalog: Peter Toth inventory

Sculpture collections
North America-related lists
Lists of outdoor sculptures in the United States
Wooden sculptures in the United States
Wooden sculptures in Canada
Wooden sculptures in Hungary